The humpback batfish (Platax batavianus), is a species of batfish in the family Ephippidae. They are found in coral reefs around the Indo-Pacific region.

Distribution and habitat
Humpback batfish are found in coral reefs around the Indo-Pacific. They are found in eastern Africa, Madagascar, Seychelles, the Maldives, India, Sri Lanka, the Andaman Sea, Indonesia, and Australia in the Indian Ocean. In the Pacific Ocean, they are found in the Gulf of Thailand, Indonesia, Vietnam, Taiwan, Japan, the Philippines, the Great Barrier Reef, New Zealand, and various Pacific islands not including Hawaii. It lives in tropical waters.

Description
Juveniles and adults have different coloration. Adults are silver with a dark bar around the eye and a faint one on the back. They have brown fins and are shaped like an oval. Juveniles are brown and are tall in appearance. They have vertical white bars. Their snouts are concave. It has tricuspid teeth and has strong jaws.

References

External links
 

Ephippidae
Fish described in 1831
Taxa named by Georges Cuvier